This is a list of Japanese football J2 League transfers in the winter transfer window 2019–20 by club.

J2 League

Júbilo Iwata

In:

Out:

Matsumoto Yamaga

In:

Out:

Omiya Ardija

In:

Out:

Tokushima Vortis

In:

Out:

Ventforet Kofu

In:

Out:

Montedio Yamagata

In:

Out:

Mito HollyHock

In:

Out:

Kyoto Sanga

In:

Out:

Fagiano Okayama

In:

Out:

Albirex Niigata

In:

Out:

Zweigen Kanazawa

In:

Out:

V-Varen Nagasaki

In:

Out:

Tokyo Verdy

In:

Out:

FC Ryukyu

In:

Out:

Renofa Yamaguchi

In:

Out:

Avispa Fukuoka

In:

Out:

JEF United Chiba

In:

Out:

Machida Zelvia

In:

Out:

Ehime FC

In:

Out:

Tochigi SC

In:

Out:

Giravanz Kitakyushu

In:

Out:

Thespakusatsu Gunma

In:

Out:

References

2019-20
Transfers
Japan